The Journal of Multivariate Analysis is a monthly peer-reviewed scientific journal that covers applications and research in the field of multivariate statistical analysis. The journal's scope includes theoretical results as well as applications of new theoretical methods in the field. Some of the research areas covered include copula modeling, functional data analysis, graphical modeling, high-dimensional data analysis, image analysis, multivariate extreme-value theory, sparse modeling, and spatial statistics.

According to the Journal Citation Reports, the journal has a 2017 impact factor of 1.009.

See also 
List of statistics journals

References

External links 
 

Statistics journals
Monthly journals
English-language journals
Publications established in 1971
Elsevier academic journals